Janków  is a village in the administrative district of Gmina Domaniów, within Oława County, Lower Silesian Voivodeship, in south-western Poland. Prior to 1945 it was in Germany.

References

Villages in Oława County